In mathematics, a jet group is a generalization of the general linear group which applies to Taylor polynomials instead of vectors at a point.  A jet group is a group of jets that describes how a Taylor polynomial transforms under changes of coordinate systems (or, equivalently, diffeomorphisms).

Overview
The k-th order jet group Gnk consists of jets of smooth diffeomorphisms φ: Rn → Rn such that φ(0)=0.

The following is a more precise definition of the jet group.

Let k ≥ 2. The differential of a function f: Rk → R can be interpreted as a section of the cotangent bundle of RK given by df: Rk → T*Rk. Similarly, derivatives of order up to m are sections of the jet bundle Jm(Rk) = Rk × W, where

Here R* is the dual vector space to R, and Si denotes the i-th symmetric power. A smooth function f: Rk → R has a prolongation jmf: Rk → Jm(Rk) defined at each point p ∈ Rk by placing the i-th partials of f at p in the Si((R*)k) component of W.

Consider a point . There is a unique polynomial fp in k variables and of order m such that p is in the image of jmfp. That is, . The differential data x′ may be transferred to lie over another point y ∈ Rn as  jmfp(y) , the partials of fp  over y.

Provide Jm(Rn) with a group structure by taking

With this group structure, Jm(Rn) is a Carnot group of class m + 1.

Because of the properties of jets under function composition, Gnk is a Lie group. The jet group is a semidirect product of the general linear group and a connected, simply connected nilpotent Lie group. It is also in fact an algebraic group, since the composition involves only polynomial operations.

Notes

References
 
 
 

Lie groups